Blackbull is a rural locality in the Shire of Croydon, Queensland, Australia. In the  Blackbull had a population of 3 people.

Geography 
The Gulf Developmental Road passes through the locality from the south-east to the south-west. The Normanton to Croydon railway line runs immediately parallel to it with the locality being served by the Blackbull railway siding. The only service that operates on the railway line is the weekly Gulflander, which operates as a tourist attraction and includes a morning tea stop at the Blackbull railway siding.

The Carron River "flows" through the locality from south-east to north-west, although in the dry season it is just a string of waterholes. It is a tributary of the Norman River which flows into the Gulf of Carpentaria.

History 
The locality takes its name from the Blackbull railway siding on Normanton to Croydon railway line. The railway siding was originally called Pattersons siding, but was renamed in 1891, reportedly after a black bull found during mustering by William and Joseph Taaffe.

In the  Blackbull had a population of 3 people.

References

External links 

Shire of Croydon
Localities in Queensland